Nông trường Trần Phú is a town of Văn Chấn District, Yên Bái Province in the northeastern region of Vietnam.

References

Populated places in Yên Bái province